Phira-on Khamla (born 31 October 1995) is a Thai woman cricketer. She made her international debut in the 2012 Women's Twenty20 Asia Cup and scored 4 runs on her WT20I debut against Pakistan in the tournament.

She was also the member of the national team at the 2013 ICC Women's World Twenty20 Qualifier.

References

External links 
 
Profile at CricHQ

1995 births
Living people
Phira-on Khamla
Phira-on Khamla